Tony DiMidio (August 20, 1942 – April 26, 2014) was an American football offensive tackle who played two seasons in the American Football League for the Kansas City Chiefs. He died at his home in 2014.

Coaching career

DiMidio joined Drexel as an assistant coach in 1971.

See also
 List of American Football League players

References

1942 births
2014 deaths
Drexel Dragons football coaches
Kansas City Chiefs players
West Chester Golden Rams football players
People from Bryn Mawr, Pennsylvania
Players of American football from Pennsylvania
American Football League players